Sarnowo  is a village in the administrative district of Gmina Stolno, within Chełmno County, Kuyavian-Pomeranian Voivodeship, in north-central Poland. It is located in the Chełmno Land in the historic region of Pomerania.

History
During the German occupation (World War II), Sarnowo was one of the sites of executions of Poles, carried out by the Germans in 1939 as part of the Intelligenzaktion. Local Polish priests were murdered by the Germans in a massacre of Poles committed in nearby Klamry, also as part of the Intelligenzaktion.

References

Villages in Chełmno County